Time to Lose is an EP by American post-punk band Tuxedomoon, released in July 1982 by Les Disques du Crépuscule. In 1986 it was compiled with Suite en sous-sol on CD.

Track listing

Personnel 
Adapted from the Time to Lose liner notes.

Tuxedomoon
 Steven Brown – lead vocals (A1, B), Hammond organ (A1), piano (A2), Moog synthesizer (B), soprano saxophone (B), design
 Peter Dachert (as Peter Principle) – guitar (A1, B), bass guitar (A1), piano (A1), effects (B)
 Blaine L. Reininger – violin (A1, A2), Casio M-10 (B)
 Winston Tong – lead vocals (A1, B)

Production and additional personnel
 Gareth Jones – production, engineering, recording
 Jean-François Octave – cover art
 Tuxedomoon – production, recording

Release history

References

External links 
 

1982 EPs
Tuxedomoon albums
Les Disques du Crépuscule EPs
albums produced by Gareth Jones (music producer)